The Maldives have competed in eight Commonwealth Games, beginning in 1986.

No athlete from the Maldives has won a medal at the Games. 

In 2016 the Maldives left the Commonwealth.

On 1 February 2020, the Maldives returned to its status as a Commonwealth republic.

References

 Official results by country

External links
Maldives Olympic Committee archive

 
Maldives and the Commonwealth of Nations
Nations at the Commonwealth Games